Subhalekhalu is a 1998 Indian Telugu-language romantic drama film directed by Muppalaneni Shiva and produced by Ramakrishna Horticultural Cine Studios. It stars Srikanth, Laila and Roshini. The film was a box office failure.

Plot

Cast 

Srikanth as Sri 
Laila as Manasa
Roshini as Priya
Satyanarayana as Manasa's father
Annapoorna as Manasa's mother
Sudhakar as Manasa's uncle
AVS as a doubtful man 
Babu Mohan as an indecisive man
Kota Srinivasa Rao 
Srihari
Brahmanandam
Sudhakar
Annapurna
Ramaprabha
 Radha Bai
Chalapathi Rao
Ranganath (guest appearance)
Nandamuri Harikrishna (guest appearance)

Soundtrack 
The songs are composed by Koti and were released under the Anand Audio label.

Reception 
Griddaluru Gopala Rao of Zamin Ryot praised the music, lyrics, picturisation of the songs, and other technical aspects but criticised the screenplay as a cliched triangular love story. Rakesh P. of Deccan Herald called it a "good family entertainer" and stated: "Though the pace is a bit slow, a tightly-edited screenplay by director Muppalaneni Siva keeps it lively."

References

External links